Phoenix Company. Ltd., better known as Phoenix Bicycles and Shanghai Phoenix Bicycles, originated as the Shanghai Third Bicycle Factory created in May, 1958. The establishment of the Third Factory marks the date that the enterprise became joint state-private owned from solely privately owned, then transferred into publicly owned enterprise. Phoenix Company, Ltd is a fully owned subsidiary of Shanghai Phoenix Import & Export Company, Ltd. Which has exclusively selling and distributing rites to Phoenix Brand bicycles and parts. Phoenix exports bicycles to more than 50 countries and earns more than US$60 million annually.

Since then the trademark Phoenix, one of the first top-ten well-known trademarks in China, has been registered in 104 countries. Phoenix bicycle is the Chinese Nation’s special-supported export product. When foreign leaders visited China they were presented with a Phoenix bike as a welcoming gift!

Phoenix Bicycles said in a statement on May 5, 2017, that it is set to produce at least five million bikes for Ofo in the next 12 months.

Classic products
The Classic Phoenix roadster is equipped with a bell, rear rack, single side stand, frame pump and rear reflectors.
 SPL68 - woman's light roadster for women 	 
 SPL65 - man's light roadster for men 	 
 SPL65 - woman's light roadster for women 	 
 SPB05 - man's single top tube bicycle 
 SPB10 - man's single top tube bicycle 	 
 SPB15 - man's double tube bicycle

Other products
Phoenix bicycles also produced children's bikes, BMXs, mountain bikes, hybrids, city bikes, leisure bikes, beach cruisers, race bikes, folding bikes, electric bikes, electric scooters, choppers, etc.

References

External links
 Phoenix Bicycles (Official Site in Chinese)
 Shanghai Phoenix Imp. & Exp. Co., Ltd. (Alibaba)
 Shanghai Phoenix Imp. & Exp. Co., Ltd. (Board of Commerce) 
 Phoenix Bicycles : Bike Graveyard
 Article at Bike China PICTURES

Cycle manufacturers of China
Government-owned companies of China
Vehicle manufacturing companies established in 1958
Chinese brands
Chinese companies established in 1958